Tatiana Perebiynis and Tatiana Poutchek were the defending champions, but Perebiynis did not compete this year. Poutchek teamed up with Yuliya Beygelzimer and successfully defended her title, by defeating Li Ting and Sun Tiantian 6–3, 7–6(7–0) in the final.

Seeds

Draw

Draw

References

External links
 Official results archive (ITF)
 Official results archive (WTA)

Doubles
Tashkent Open
2003 in Uzbekistani sport